The Flatiron Building is a highrise completed in 1913 at 540 Market Street at Sutter Street in the Financial District of San Francisco, California. The 10-story,  structure is designated landmark No. 155.

Jimdo has offices in the building, as does TextNow, and Trim. Previously, Boutique Air had its headquarters there.

The building was featured in the opening credits of the 1980s detective series Crazy Like a Fox since lead character Harry Fox had his offices in the building.

See also

List of San Francisco Designated Landmarks
List of tallest buildings in San Francisco

References

External links
The Flat Iron Building San Francisco image at Red Bubble

Office buildings in San Francisco
Financial District, San Francisco
Market Street (San Francisco)
San Francisco Designated Landmarks
Flatiron buildings